
Year 386 (CCCLXXXVI) was a common year starting on Thursday (link will display the full calendar) of the Julian calendar. At the time, it was known as the Year of the Consulship of Honorius and Euodius (or, less frequently, year 1139 Ab urbe condita). The denomination 386 for this year has been used since the early medieval period, when the Anno Domini calendar era became the prevalent method in Europe for naming years.

Events 
 By place 

 Roman Empire 
 Emperor Theodosius I signs a peace treaty with King Shapur III; they divide Armenia into two kingdoms (vassal states). The treaty establishes friendly relations between the Roman Empire and Persia for the next 36 years.
 The Greuthungi cross the Danube to raid the Roman garrisons on the northern frontier. They are met midstream by a well-armed fleet, and their rafts and dugouts sink. Those not drowned are slaughtered. 
 Magnus Maximus invades Italy; he destroys Novara for supporting his rival Valentinian II.
 Theodosius I begins to rebuild the present-day Basilica of Saint Paul Outside the Walls.
 A column is constructed at Constantinople in honour of Theodosius I. Reliefs depict the emperor's victory over the barbarians in the Balkan.

 Asia 
 The Northern Wei Dynasty begins in China. The Tuoba clan of the Xianbei tribe (proto-Mongol people) is politically separated from the Chinese dynasties established in Jiankang (modern Nanjing). The Northern Wei rulers are ardent supporters of Buddhism.  Prince Dao Wu Di, age 15, becomes the first emperor (see Northern dynasties).

 By topic 

 Religion 
 Saint Ambrose defends the rights of the Catholic Church with respect to those of the State. 
 Theodosius I is converted to Christianity. 
 John Chrysostom becomes a presbyter; he also writes eight Homilies  entitled "Adversus Iudaeos" ("Against the Jews").
 Augustine converts to Christianity. He ends his marriage plans after hearing a sermon on the life of Saint Anthony.
 The fight in the Roman Empire against anti-pagan laws becomes increasingly futile.
 Sumela Monastery is established in Asia Minor.

Births 
 Jin Gongdi, last emperor of the Jin Dynasty (d. 421) 
 Nestorius, founder of Nestorianism (approximate date)

Deaths 
 November 23 – Jin Feidi, emperor of the Jin Dynasty (b. 342)
 Cyril of Jerusalem, theologian and saint
 Demophilus, Patriarch of Constantinople 
 Duan Sui, ruler of the Western Yan
 Fu Pi, emperor of the Former Qin 
 Murong Chong, emperor of the Western Yan (b. 359)
 Murong Yao, emperor of the Western Yan
 Murong Yi, ruler of the Western Yan
 Murong Zhong, emperor of the Western Yan
 Pulcheria, daughter of Theodosius I (b. 385)
 Wang Xianzhi, Chinese calligrapher (b. 344) 
 Yang, empress of the Former Qin

References